Alexander Luke Nathanial McQueen (born 24 March 1995) is a professional footballer who plays as a full-back. Born in England, McQueen represents the Grenada national team internationally.

Club career

Early career
McQueen began his career at the Tottenham Hotspur Academy, but was released by Spurs in 2015 without making a first team appearance at White Hart Lane during his one year as a senior professional.

Carlisle United
McQueen signed a one-year contract with League Two side Carlisle United in June 2015. He made his debut for the "Cumbrians" on 11 August, in a 3–1 League Cup First round win over Chesterfield at Brunton Park. After beating Queens Park Rangers 2–1 in the second round of the League Cup, McQueen was an integral part of the Carlisle team that managed to take Liverpool to penalty shoot-out in the third round of the competition. Despite narrowly missing out on a place in the fourth round of the League Cup, McQueen's performance at Anfield was rewarded by being named in the Team of the Round. McQueen was offered a new deal at the end of 2015–16 season, but finally rejected it on 15 August 2016.

After failing to find a new club, McQueen trained with Carlisle in September 2016, before re-joining the Cumbrian-based side on 1 December 2016, on a one-month contract.

VPS
On 16 April 2018, McQueen joined Finnish side VPS despite having signed a one-year contract with PS Kemi a month earlier. The contract included a one-month probation period which saw the contract not continued after the probation period.

Dagenham & Redbridge
On 9 August 2018, McQueen returned to English football to sign with National League side Dagenham & Redbridge with a contract running until January 2019. He made his debut for the Daggers two days later in the 2–2 draw with Maidenhead United, scoring his first professional goal and the equaliser, shortly after replacing Chike Kandi in the second half. McQueen played 64 times for Daggers in all competitions across two seasons, scoring six goals. He was released at the end of the 2019–20 season.

Barnet
McQueen signed for Barnet on 24 September 2020. He left the club after making 37 appearances in his only season with the Bees.

Indy Eleven
On 10 December 2021, it was announced that McQueen would join USL Championship side Indy Eleven ahead of their 2022 season. McQueen made his debut for Indy on 12 March 2022, in a 1–0 loss to Loudoun United FC. He left Indy Eleven following their 2022 season.

International career
McQueen made his international debut for the Grenada national team in a friendly 2–2 tie with Trinidad and Tobago national football team on 12 November 2017. McQueen scored his first goal for the Spice Boys on 4 June 2022, during a 3–1 CONCACAF Nations League loss to El Salvador.

Style of play
Able to play at either full-back position as well as central midfield, McQueen is an athletic and pacey two-footed player.

Career statistics

Club

International

Scores and results list Templatonia's goal tally first, score column indicates score after each Template goal.

References

External links

1995 births
Living people
Footballers from the London Borough of Barking and Dagenham
Grenadian footballers
Grenada international footballers
English footballers
English sportspeople of Grenadian descent
Black British sportspeople
Association football fullbacks
Association football midfielders
Tottenham Hotspur F.C. players
Carlisle United F.C. players
Dagenham & Redbridge F.C. players
Barnet F.C. players
Indy Eleven players
English Football League players
National League (English football) players
People from Rush Green, London
2021 CONCACAF Gold Cup players